Torristas and Molinistas  is a term used to describe a political feud in Los Angeles, California, in the last part of the 20th century. The term was akin to the Montagues and Capulets or the Hatfields and McCoys, a highly localized internecine feud. The term gets its name from the antipathy between Art Torres, Gloria Molina, and their respective allies.

Background
The "Eastside" of Los Angeles is a general reference to those neighborhoods, east of the Los Angeles River, that are predominantly Mexican American like Boyle Heights, El Sereno and Lincoln Heights. The Eastside is distinct from the unincorporated East Los Angeles. Ed Roybal had represented the area in the Los Angeles City Council, and as a Member of Congress, but Mexican Americans had little elected representation. In 1972 Richard Alatorre was elected to the Assembly, and in 1974 Art Torres was also elected. This gave the two men a power base in "Eastside" (and Latino) politics in Los Angeles.

The roots of the conflict came from decisions made by the eastside "Torres-Alatorre" political machine after the redistricting due to the 1981 apportionment. Torres and Alatorre decided that Torres would run for the 24th State Senate district against Alex P. Garcia. Richard Polanco would in turn run for the 56th Assembly District being vacated by Torres. Assemblyman Matthew Martinez would challenge John Rousselot in the 30th Congressional District and Esteban Torres would run in the 34th Congressional District. Molina was a former aide to Art Torres, Willie Brown, and had also worked for Jimmy Carter. Molina approached Torres and Alatorre about running in the 56th Assembly District, but was told that Polanco was the chosen candidate. Molina ran anyway, defeating Polanco, and a rift grew in Eastside politics. In doing so, she established her own power base and a path for other Chicanas to follow her.

The 1985 resignation of Los Angeles District 14 councilman Art Snyder made way for the first Latino, Alatorre, to represent the district – the first Latino since Roybal. In 1987, Molina defeated Alatorre ally, Larry Gonzalez, in the race for the District 1 city council race. There was an open feud between Alatorre and Molina on the city council. In February 1991, Molina was elected to the Los Angeles County Board of Supervisors, representing the First Supervisorial District, and defeating her former mentor, Art Torres.

Some of the people who found themselves in one camp or another include Lucille Roybal-Allard, Xavier Becerra, Richard Polanco and Hilda Solis. The internecine character of this feud came out in the 2001 race for mayor of Los Angeles, which pitted Becerra against Antonio Villaraigosa.

The supporters of Torres and Alatorre were the Torristas, and Molina's supporter are known as Molinistas.

See also
 Politics of Los Angeles County
 Brown Berets
 Chicano Moratorium
 History of Mexican Americans in Los Angeles

References

Bibliography

Further reading

External links

Hispanic and Latino American
Political history of California
History of Los Angeles